Two Dogs Fuckin' is the first album by rock band Let 3. The album was released in 1989 by Helidon.

The album was digitally remastered in 2009 by Dallas Records following the 20 year anniversary of the album.

Reception

The album was well received by Croatian critics and fans. The song "Izgubljeni" was a big hit among fans and has since become a song that the football supporters of HNK Rijeka Armada uses at matches.

Track listing

Personnel
Damir Martinović – Mrle (bass, vocal)
Zoran Prodanović – Prlja (vocal)
Ivica Dražić – Miki (guitar, voice)
Nenad Tubin – Tubin (drums, voice)
Igor Perković – Gigi (guitar)

References

1989 albums
Let 3 albums